Luis Pentrelli (born 15 June 1932) is an Argentine footballer. He played in seven matches for the Argentina national football team in 1956. He was also part of Argentina's squad for the 1956 South American Championship.

References

External links
 

1932 births
Living people
Argentine footballers
Argentina international footballers
Place of birth missing (living people)
Association football midfielders
Boca Juniors footballers
Club Atlético Sarmiento footballers
Club de Gimnasia y Esgrima La Plata footballers
Udinese Calcio players
ACF Fiorentina players
Racing Club de Avellaneda footballers
Millonarios F.C. players
Chacarita Juniors footballers
Argentine expatriate footballers
Expatriate footballers in Italy
Expatriate footballers in Colombia